Julius Kahn (February 28, 1861 – December 18, 1924) was a United States Congressman who was succeeded by his wife Florence Prag Kahn after his death. He has been described by the American Jerusalem as "among the most influential Jews in San Francisco—as well as national–civic life, from the middle of the 19th century into the 1930s".

Biography
Kahn was born in Kuppenheim, in the Grand Duchy of Baden, in what would become Germany. He immigrated to the United States with his parents, who settled in California in 1866. After studying law in San Francisco, he was elected a member of the State Assembly in 1892 and admitted to the bar in January 1894. 
He was elected as a Republican to the 56th and 57th Congresses (March 4, 1899 – March 3, 1903). Although he unsuccessfully contested the election of Edward J. Livernash to the 58th Congress, he was elected to the 59th and to the nine succeeding Congresses and served from March 4, 1905, until his death in 1924.

During his time in the House of Representatives he was noted as an advocate of military preparedness. He helped draft and secure the passage of the National Defense Act of 1916, the Selective Service Act of 1917, and the National Defense Act of 1920. He served as chairman of Committee on Military Affairs (66th–68th Congresses). Representative Kahn also authored the Kahn Exclusion Act, ultimately enacted as the Alien Exclusion Act, telling Congress that "I submit if the Chinese people themselves would deal honestly with us, and if they resorted less to trickery and duplicity to circumvent our laws, then there would be no need of closing up all possible loopholes in the law with the seemingly severely restrictive measures that the Chinese themselves make necessary."

At the time of his death, he had been re-elected to the 69th Congress. His wife, Florence Prag Kahn, succeeded him in Congress and served until 1937. He was buried in the Home of Peace Cemetery in Colma, California. A well-known playground and adjacent ballpark in San Francisco was named in his honor; in 2018, it was proposed to strip his name from the playground due to the fact that he championed the extension of the Chinese Exclusion Act in 1902 which he justified by stating that the Chinese people were "morally, the most debased people on the face of the earth."

Source materials
The Western Jewish History Center, of the Magnes Collection of Jewish Art and Life, in Berkeley, California has a large collection of family papers, documents, correspondence, and photographs relating to Julius Kahn and to his wife, Florence Prag Kahn.

See also
List of Jewish members of the United States Congress
List of United States Congress members who died in office (1900–49)

References

 
 Florence Kahn: Congressional Widow to Trailblazing Lawmaker Multimedia presentation created by the Office of History and Preservation, Office of the Clerk of the U.S. House of Representatives.

External links
 

1861 births
1924 deaths
People from Rastatt (district)
People from the Grand Duchy of Baden
19th-century German Jews
Anti-Chinese sentiment in the United States
German emigrants to the United States
American people of German-Jewish descent
American Reform Jews
Jewish members of the United States House of Representatives
Republican Party members of the United States House of Representatives from California
Republican Party members of the California State Assembly
Politicians from San Francisco
Burials at Home of Peace Cemetery (Colma, California)